Mahrt is a surname. Notable people with this surname include:

 Al Mahrt (1893–1970), American football player
 Armin Mahrt (1897–?), American football player
 Haakon Bugge Mahrt (1901–1990), Norwegian writer
 Jan Bugge-Mahrt (born 1954), Norwegian diplomat
 Lou Mahrt (1904–1982), American football player
 Preben Mahrt (1920–1989), Danish actor

References

Low German surnames